The Koksu (Köksu; su meaning "river") is a river of the Balkhash-Alakol Basin, Kazakhstan. It flows within Almaty Region, in the historical Semirechye region, from the western slopes of the Dzungarian Alatau.

It is the largest river in the Koksu District, named after it.

Several hydro-electric projects are located along the river including the Kyzylbulak Hydroelectric Power Plant and Kyzylkungei Hydroelectric Power Plant.

References

Rivers of Kazakhstan
Landforms of Almaty Region
Tributaries of Lake Balkhash